The lemon-barred forest-skink (Concinnia ampla)  is a species of skink found in Queensland in Australia.

References

Concinnia
Reptiles described in 1980
Taxa named by Jeanette Covacevich
Taxa named by Keith R. McDonald (herpetologist)